Adelaide of Ballenstedt ( - after 1139) was the daughter of Otto of Ballenstedt and a member of the House of Ascania. She married, successively, Henry IV, Count of Stade, and Werner, Count of Osterburg.

Family
Adelaide was the only daughter of Otto, Count of Ballenstedt, and Eilika, daughter of Magnus Billung, Duke of Saxony. Her brother was Albert the Bear.

First Marriage 
Adelaide's first husband was Henry IV, Count of Stade (d.1128). The couple had no recorded children together.

Second marriage
In 1139 Adelaide married for a second time to Werner of Velthim, count of Osterburg (d. after 1169). According to the Annales Stadenses, Werner was a vassal (vassus) of Adelaide's brother, Albert the Bear. With Werner, Adelaide had at least one son: Albert of Osterburg.

References 
A. Thiele, Erzählende genealogische Stammtafeln zur europäischen Geschichte" Band I, Teilband 1 Deutsche Kaiser-, Königs-, Herzogs- und Grafenhäuser I
L. Partenheimer, Albrecht der Bär. Gründer der Mark Brandenburg und des Fürstentums Anhalt.
R. Hucke, Die Grafen von Stade 990-1144 (Stade 1956).

Notes

External links
Adelheid von Ballenstedt (in German)

11th-century German nobility
11th-century German women
German countesses
Margravines of Germany
Daughters of monarchs